Hollywood/Santa Monica is a neighborhood in east Dallas, Texas, United States. The neighborhood lies to the northwest of  SH 78 (East Grand Avenue) and the Tennison Park Golf Course. It is a part of a special conservation district to protect the subdivisions of Hollywood Heights and Santa Monica.

About

Hollywood/Santa Monica was one of the first conservation districts in the City of Dallas. It was created after a two-year effort to preserve the architectural integrity, and thus the value of the homes. Many of the area homes were built in the Tudor style before World War II. Lindsley Park is in the neighborhood and it is close to White Rock Lake, the Dallas Arboretum and Botanical Garden and the popular Lakewood neighborhood.

Education
Hollywood/Santa Monica is in the Dallas Independent School District (DISD).

The residents are zoned to Lakewood Elementary, J. L. Long Middle School, and Woodrow Wilson High School.

Other area schools include the K-8 school Eduardo Mata Montessori School, also a DISD school, and the Lindsley Park Community School, a charter elementary school operated by Lumin Education.

References

External links
 HSMNA Home Page
 parent site